Chellaston is an electoral ward in the city of Derby, England.  The ward contains seven listed buildings that are recorded in the National Heritage List for England.  Of these, one is listed at Grade II*, the middle of the three grades, and the others are at Grade II, the lowest grade.  The ward contains a suburban village to the south of the city centre, and it is mainly residential.  The listed buildings consist of a church, houses and a cottage, a farmhouse and farm buildings, and a war memorial.


Key

Buildings

References

Citations

Sources

 

Lists of listed buildings in Derbyshire
Listed buildings in Derby